Pori Stadium is a multi-purpose stadium in Pori, Finland. It is currently used primarily for football and stadium is the home of FC Jazz and NiceFutis. It is also the former home ground of FC PoPa.

Pori Stadium is located at Isomäki sports center some two kilometres south of the city. Stadium is sometimes nicknamed as the Stadium of Eternal Wind due to windy conditions that are common on the stadium and its surroundings. By the main entrance is a javelin thrower statue by Finnish sculptor Kalervo Kallio which is inspired by Matti Järvinen's gold medal throw at the 1932 Summer Olympics.

History
Pori Stadium was built in 1963–1965. It is the third main stadium in Pori replacing the 1935 opened Herralahti Stadium. The football ground was built first and the opening match was played in May 1963. Stadium was completed two years later as the stands and other facilities were finished. During its history, Pori Stadium has been renovated three times. The latest uplift in 1999–2000 was made to implement new stands and lights.

Finland national football team has played twice at Pori Stadium. May 1984 Finland beat Northern Ireland in the 1986 World Cup qualification and three years later Finnish Olympic team played against Austria. Pori Stadium was the venue of 1993 Finnish Cup final. The Finnish Championships in Athletics, Kalevan kisat -games, have been competed at Pori Stadium in 1967, 1983 and 2005. Next games will be held in 2015.

Attendance record 12,050 was made at 1967 Kalevan kisat. The record in football matches is 11,193 in October 1993 as FC Jazz played its season's last game against MyPa with the national title on the line.

Football internationals at Pori Stadium

References

External links 
 
Pori Stadium in European Football Magazine
Groundhopping at Pori Stadium

Football venues in Finland
Athletics (track and field) venues in Finland
Buildings and structures in Pori
Sports venues completed in 1965
Ässät